Vouillé is a commune in the Vienne department in the Nouvelle-Aquitaine region in western France. Inhabitants are known in French as Vouglaisiens.

The Battle of Vouillé or Vouglé (from Latin Campus Vogladensis) was fought in the northern marches of Visigothic territory, at Vouillé, Vienne, (Gaul), in the spring of 507 between the Franks commanded by Clovis and the Visigoths of Alaric II, the conqueror of Spain.

Population

See also
Communes of the Vienne department

References

Communes of Vienne